Dušan Melichárek (born 29 November 1983) is a Czech footballer and a goalkeeper who last played for Malmö FF in the Swedish top flight.

Career

Malmö FF
Melichárek came to Malmö FF in the beginning of 2008 on loan from Mjällby. He was bought by the club after a successful loan period. He acted as reserve goalkeeper behind Jonas Sandqvist and later behind Johan Dahlin. However, he played for the majority of the matches during the 2011 season because of a long-term injury on Dahlin and participated in Malmö FF's campaign to qualify for the 2011–12 UEFA Champions League, the club was eventually knocked out in the play-off round. Melichárek chose not to renew his contract with Malmö FF after the 2011 season and to search for a new club. He eventually signed for his youth club 1. FC Slovácko.

After a spell at FC Zbrojovka Brno, where he played four years, Melichárek moved back abroad again to Sweden, rejoining Malmö FF prior to the 2019 season. This meant he once more formed part of the goalkeeping team with Dahlin, who also had returned to the club earlier after a spell abroad. Sporting director Daniel Andersson cited Melichárek's familiarity with the club and also having worked with Dahlin and goalkeeper coach Jonnie Fedel before as a key part in the recruitment of Melichárek.

External links
  Malmö FF Profile
  SvFF profile

References

1983 births
Living people
Czech footballers
Association football goalkeepers
Czech First League players
Allsvenskan players
FC Zbrojovka Brno players
1. FC Slovácko players
Malmö FF players
Mjällby AIF players
Czech expatriate footballers
Expatriate footballers in Sweden
Czech expatriate sportspeople in Sweden
People from Vyškov
Sportspeople from the South Moravian Region